Fort Simcoe was a United States Army fort erected in south-central Washington Territory to house troops sent to keep watch over local Indian tribes. The site and remaining buildings are preserved as Fort Simcoe Historical State Park, located eight miles (13 km) west of modern White Swan, Washington, in the foothills of the Cascade Mountains.

History
The site was a school for tribes of Indigenous peoples of the Americas from areas all around the present state of Washington. Prior to 1850, the site was used as a school where Native American children taken from their families were forced to cease practicing traditional customs and speak English, a specific practice in ethnocide. Punishment for non-compliant children included imprisonment in a small jail.

The fort was built in the late 1850s in an old oak grove watered by natural springs by future Civil War general Robert S. Garnett. The fort was in use for three years. The park was established in 1956.

The fort was built in the middle of the Yakima Valley and the Yakama Tribe's traditional fishing areas. This location allowed soldiers of the new commander to keep an eye out for visitors to the tribe and basically keep an eye on the tribe. The Fort Simcoe program can be labeled as an act of cultural genocide. Fort Simcoe is viewed this way because the U.S. government merged 14 different tribes from their original homes and enforced assimilation to American culture. The tribes were to learn famous Americans and given Christian/American names. In 1922, the U.S. government decided to move the Indian agency from Fort Simcoe to Toppenish which triggered extreme emotions. Moving the Indian Agency recalled the act of relocations for generations of the original tribes.  The location of the fort also provided trading routes established by waterway or railroad. Architect Louis Scholl designed and constructed the fort. Fort Simcoe is similar to the design of Fort Dalles where there are blockhouses at each corners but no stockade allowing barracks to define the fortification. James Harvey Wilbur and Captain Frederick Dent took on the challenge of creating a road passage to Fort Simcoe, and said about their goals that "the fort's location also fits perfectly with the army strategic goal to carve out a road system that connected California with Washington Territory".

Park and museum
The park is primarily an interpretive effort, telling the story of mid-19th-century army life and providing images of the lives of local Native Americans. Five original buildings are still standing at the fort: the commander's house, three captain's houses, and a blockhouse. Various other buildings have been recreated to appear original. Houses are filled with period furnishings. The park was placed on the National Register of Historic Places in 1974.

The interpretive center, the original commander's house and two officer's buildings with period furnishings open to the public from April through September on Wednesday through Sunday.  The original blockhouse and other recreated fort buildings are not open to the public.  Special re-enactments and living history events are held during the year, as well as other special events.

References

External links

Fort Simcoe Historical State Park Washington State Parks and Recreation Commission
Fort Simcoe Historical State Park Map Washington State Parks and Recreation Commission
Photos of Fort Simcoe Library of Congress Historic American Buildings Survey/Historic American Engineering Record/Historic American Landscapes Survey

Simcoe
State parks of Washington (state)
Museums in Yakima County, Washington
Military and war museums in Washington (state)
Native American museums in Washington (state)
Parks in Yakima County, Washington
Buildings and structures in Yakima County, Washington
National Register of Historic Places in Yakima County, Washington
Simcoe
Protected areas established in 1956
1956 establishments in Washington (state)